The 1983 Virginia Slims of Dallas was a tennis tournament played on indoor carpet courts at the Moody Coliseum in Dallas, Texas in the United States that was part of the 1983 Virginia Slims World Championship Series. It was the 12th edition of the tournament and was held from March 7 through March 14, 1983. First-seeded Martina Navratilova won the singles title and earned $30,000 first-prize money.

Finals

Singles

 Martina Navratilova defeated  Chris Evert-Lloyd 6–4, 6–0
 It was Navratilova's 4th singles title of the year and the 74th of her career.

Doubles

 Martina Navratilova /  Pam Shriver defeated  Rosemary Casals /  Wendy Turnbull 6–3, 6–2
 It was Navratilova's 8th title of the year and the 155th of her career. It was Shriver's 4th title of the year and the 38th of her career.

Prize money

See also
 Evert–Navratilova rivalry
 1983 Dallas Open

References

External links
 ITF tournament edition details

Virginia Slims of Dallas
Virginia Slims of Dallas
Virginia
Virginia
Virginia Slims of Dallas
Virginia Slims of Dallas